

A
 Abstract simplicial complex
 Addition chain
 Scholz conjecture
 Algebraic combinatorics
 Alternating sign matrix
 Almost disjoint sets
 Antichain
 Arrangement of hyperplanes
 Assignment problem
 Quadratic assignment problem
 Audioactive decay

B
 Barcode
 Matrix code
 QR Code
 Universal Product Code
 Bell polynomials
 Bertrand's ballot theorem
 Binary matrix
 Binomial theorem
 Block design 
 Balanced incomplete block design(BIBD)
 Symmetric balanced incomplete block design (SBIBD)
 Partially balanced incomplete block designs (PBIBDs)
 Block walking
 Boolean satisfiability problem
 2-satisfiability
 3-satisfiability
 Bracelet (combinatorics)
 Bruck–Chowla–Ryser theorem

C
 Catalan number
 Cellular automaton
 Collatz conjecture
 Combination
 Combinatorial design
 Combinatorial number system
 Combinatorial optimization
 Combinatorial search
 Constraint satisfaction problem
 Conway's Game of Life
 Cycles and fixed points
 Cyclic order
 Cyclic permutation
 Cyclotomic identity

D
 Data integrity
 Alternating bit protocol
 Checksum
 Cyclic redundancy check
 Luhn formula
 Error detection
 Error-detecting code
 Error-detecting system
 Message digest
 Redundancy check
 Summation check
 De Bruijn sequence
 Deadlock
 Delannoy number
 Dining philosophers problem
 Mutual exclusion
 Rendezvous problem
 Derangement
 Dickson's lemma
 Dinitz conjecture
 Discrete optimization
 Dobinski's formula

E
 Eight queens puzzle
 Entropy coding
 Enumeration
 Algebraic enumeration
 Combinatorial enumeration
 Burnside's lemma
 Erdős–Ko–Rado theorem
 Euler number

F
 Faà di Bruno's formula
 Factorial number system
 Family of sets
 Faulhaber's formula
 Fifteen puzzle
 Finite geometry
 Finite intersection property

G
 Game theory
 Combinatorial game theory
 Combinatorial game theory (history)
 Combinatorial game theory (pedagogy)
 Star (game theory)
 Zero game, fuzzy game
 Dots and Boxes
 Impartial game
 Digital sum
 Nim
 Nimber
 Sprague–Grundy theorem
 Partizan game
 Solved board games
 Col game
 Sim (pencil game)
 Sprouts (game)
 Surreal numbers
 Transposition table
 Black Path Game
 Sylver coinage
 Generating function
 Golomb coding
 Golomb ruler
 Graeco-Latin square
 Gray code

H
 Hadamard matrices
 Complex Hadamard matrices
 Butson-type Hadamard matrices
 Generalized Hadamard matrices
 Regular Hadamard matrices
 Hall's marriage theorem
 Perfect matching
 Hamming distance
 Hash function
 Hash collision
 Perfect hash function
 Heilbronn triangle problem
 Helly family
 Hypergeometric function identities
 Hypergeometric series
 Hypergraph

I
 Incidence structure
 Induction puzzles
 Integer partition
 Ferrers graph

K
 Kakeya needle problem
 Kirkman's schoolgirl problem
 Knapsack problem
 Kruskal–Katona theorem

L
 Lagrange inversion theorem
 Lagrange reversion theorem
 Lah number
 Large number
 Latin square
 Levenshtein distance
 Lexicographical order
 Littlewood–Offord problem
 Lubell–Yamamoto–Meshalkin inequality (known as the LYM inequality)
 Lucas chain

M
 MacMahon Master theorem
 Magic square
 Matroid embedding
 Monge array
 Monomial order
 Moreau's necklace-counting function
 Motzkin number
 Multiplicities of entries in Pascal's triangle
 Multiset
 Munkres' assignment algorithm

N
 Necklace (combinatorics)
 Necklace problem
 Negligible set
 Almost all
 Almost everywhere
 Null set
 Newton's identities

O
 Ordered partition of a set
 Orthogonal design
 Complex orthogonal design
 Quaternion orthogonal design

P
 Packing problem
 Bin packing problem
 Partition of a set
 Noncrossing partition
 Permanent
 Permutation
 Enumerations of specific permutation classes
 Josephus permutation
 Permutation matrix
 Permutation pattern
 Permutation (disambiguation)
 Shuffling playing cards
 Pochhammer symbol
 Polyforms
 Polycubes
 Soma cube
 Polyiamonds
 Polyominoes
 Hexominoes
 Pentominoes
 Tetrominoes
 Polysquare puzzle
 Projective plane
 Property B
 Prüfer sequence

Q
 q-analog
 q-binomial theorem—see Gaussian binomial coefficient
 q-derivative
 q-series
 q-theta function
 q-Vandermonde identity

R
 Rencontres numbers
 Rubik's Cube
 How to solve the Rubik's Cube
 Optimal solutions for Rubik's Cube
 Rubik's Revenge

S
 Schröder number
 Search algorithm
 Binary search
 Interpolation search
 Linear search
 Local search
 String searching algorithm
 Aho–Corasick string matching algorithm
 Fuzzy string searching
 grep, agrep, wildcard character
 Knuth–Morris–Pratt algorithm
 Sequences with zero autocorrelation function
 Series-parallel networks problem
 Set cover problem
 Shuffling puzzle
 Small set (combinatorics)
 Sparse matrix, Sparse array
 Sperner family
 Sperner's lemma
 Stable marriage problem
 Steiner system
 Stirling number
 Stirling transform
 String algorithm
 Straddling checkerboard
 Subsequence
 Longest common subsequence problem
 Optimal-substructure
 Subset sum problem
 Symmetric functions
 Szemerédi's theorem

T
 Thue–Morse sequence
 Tower of Hanoi
 Turán number
 Turing tarpit

U
 Union-closed sets conjecture
 Urn problems (probability)

V
 Vandermonde's identity

W
 Weighing matrices
 Weighted round robin
 Deficit round robin

Y
 Young tableau

Combinatorics
+